General Company for Ports of Iraq (GCPI) is a governmental company under the Ministry of Transportation in the Republic of Iraq. It was founded on October 9, 1919. GCPI is concerned with the management of Iraqi ports and navigation in the territorial waters and carries out maintenance and dredging in the navigational channels that the company manages.

The company manages Umm Qasr port, Khor Al-Zubair port, Al-Maqal Port, and Abu Flous Port.

References

External links
General Company for Ports of Iraq official website 

1919 establishments in Iraq
Transport companies established in 1919
Transport companies of Iraq
Government-owned companies of Iraq
 General Company for Ports of Iraq
Companies based in Baghdad